The women's 4 × 200 metre freestyle relay competition of the swimming events at the 2015 Southeast Asian Games was held on 8 June at the OCBC Aquatic Centre in Singapore.

Schedule
All times are Singapore Standard Time (UTC+08:00)

Records

Results

Final

The final was held on 8 June.

References

External links
 

Women's 4 x 200 metre freestyle relay
Women's sports competitions in Singapore
2015 in women's swimming